Ballater railway station is a former station in the village of Ballater in Aberdeenshire, Scotland. The station was formerly the terminus of a branch line from Aberdeen.

It was the nearest station to Balmoral Castle, a personal residence of the British monarch.

History
Opened on 17 October 1866 by the Aboyne and Braemar Railway this was the third of a series of openings (Aboyne to Ballater), by three different companies to connect Ballater with Aberdeen, the others were Aboyne to Banchory by the Deeside Extension Railway and Banchory to Aberdeen by the Deeside Railway.

All three sections of the branch were operated by the Great North of Scotland Railway (GNSR) and in 1876 they were all acquired by it.

The GNSR became part of the London and North Eastern Railway during the Grouping of 1923, passing on to the Scottish Region of British Railways during the nationalisation of 1948.

The station was host to a LNER camping coach from 1937 to 1939.

The station closed for passengers on 28 February 1966 and for goods on 18 July 1966.

Royal events
In August 1912, Ballater railway station played an important role when the body of Alexander Duff, 1st Duke of Fife, the son-in-law of King Edward VII, was transferred to Mar Lodge, Braemar, from St George's Chapel, Windsor Castle. On 9 August 1912 the Glasgow Herald reported on the funeral:

Ballater Station was the location of an infamous event on 23 September 1936. On this day, King Edward VIII was due to open a new hospital in Aberdeen; however, he sent the then Duke and Duchess of York (later King George VI and Queen Elizabeth) in his place, citing that he was unable to attend as the Court was still in mourning. This was a foil. Edward VIII was seen at precisely the same time as the Yorks' opened the hospital, meeting Mrs Wallis Simpson off a train at Ballater Station. Mrs Simpson at the time was the mistress of Edward VIII though this fact was relatively unknown to the British public at this time owing to a 'silence' in the British press. Mrs Simpson was the King's special guest at Balmoral.

Services

Current use
The old station, containing Queen Victoria's waiting room, is a visitor centre with a replica royal carriage. The station houses the public library and a restaurant and cafe.

The former station site is the western trailhead of the Deeside Way, a long-distance footpath that follows the length of the former railway to Aberdeen.

The station was awarded Project of the Year, and the Conservation award, in 2019 in the Aberdeen Society of Architects annual design awards.

Fire
In the early hours of 12 May 2015, fire crews were called out to a major blaze at the station. The fire was fought for around three hours but reports say the building was "around 90 percent destroyed". The fire is believed to have started in the Station Restaurant, one of several businesses at the station. The building has subsequently been restored and reopened as a tourist information centre, restaurant, tearoom and public library.

See also
Royal Deeside Line

References

Further reading

External links
Film of the station and the Deeside line.

 Station on navigable O.S. map

Disused railway stations in Aberdeenshire
Railway stations in Great Britain opened in 1866
Railway stations in Great Britain closed in 1966
Beeching closures in Scotland
Former Great North of Scotland Railway stations
1966 disestablishments in Scotland
1866 establishments in Scotland
Ballater